The 1980 Tour de France was the 67th edition of Tour de France, one of cycling's Grand Tours. The Tour began in Frankfurt with a prologue individual time trial on 26 June and Stage 10 occurred on 7 July with a flat stage to Bordeaux. The race finished on the Champs-Élysées in Paris on 20 July.

Prologue
26 June 1980 — Frankfurt to Frankfurt,  (individual time trial)

Stage 1a
27 June 1980 — Frankfurt to Wiesbaden,

Stage 1b
27 June 1980 — Wiesbaden to Frankfurt,  (team time trial)

Stage 2
28 June 1980 — Frankfurt to Metz,

Stage 3
29 June 1980 — Metz to Liège,

Stage 4
30 June 1980 — Circuit de Spa,  (individual time trial)

Stage 5
1 July 1980 — Liège to Lille,

Stage 6
2 July 1980 — Lille to Compiègne,

Stage 7a
3 July 1980 — Compiègne to Beauvais,  (team time trial)

Stage 7b
3 July 1980 — Beauvais to Rouen,

Stage 8
4 July 1980 — Flers to Saint-Malo,

Stage 9
6 July 1980 — Saint-Malo to Nantes,

Stage 10
7 July 1980 — Rochefort to Bordeaux,

References

1980 Tour de France
Tour de France stages